LExEN, an acronym for Life in Extreme Environments, is a research program overseen by the National Science Foundation.  It was originally developed by G. Michael Purdy in 1997 as an area of research in which scientists could seek funding for activities in the polar regions.  Participating were the Directorates for Biological Sciences, Mathematical and Physical Sciences, Engineering, Geosciences, and the Office of Polar Programs of the National Science Foundation.  The program sought to place a strong emphasis upon those life-supporting environments that exist near the extremes of planetary conditions. The study of extreme habitats, both planetary and extra-planetary, was underpinned by the idea that "deep understanding of certain earth-bound microbial systems would provide important insights into life-sustaining processes and the origin of life on our own planet, while illuminating the search for life in other planetary environments."

In 1999 it was announced that the future of LExEN was still under consideration but despite the lack of research in the topic, the program no longer appears on the NSF A-Z Index of Funding Opportunities.

LExEN Award Winners

Jan P. Amend	Washington University in St. Louis Growth Media for Hyperthermophiles: Geochemical Constraints on Realistic Carbon and Energy Sources in Shallow Marine Hydrothermal Systems
Ariel D. Anbar	University of Rochester	Biogenic Fractionations of Transition Metal Isotopes: Novel Methods for the Examination of Life in Extreme Environments
Douglas H. Bartlett Scripps Institution of Oceanography Characterization of the Upper Pressure Limits for Microbial Life
Don K. Button University of Alaska	Characteristics of Bacteria Native to Extremely Dilute Environments
David A. Caron Woods Hole Oceanographic Institution Protistan Biodiversity in Antarctic Marine Ecosystems: Molecular Biological and Traditional Approaches
James P. Cowen University of Hawaii Collaborative Research: Development of Capability to Measure Proxides of Microbial Activity Within Ocean Crust
Christian H. Fritsen	Montana State University Collaborative Research: Microbial Life within the Extreme Environment Posed by Permanent Antarctic Lake Ice
John E. Hobbie 	Marine Biological Laboratory	Ecology of Microbial Systems in Extreme Environments: The Role of Nanoflagellates in Cold and Nutrient-Poor Arctic Freshwaters
Holger W. Jannasch	Woods Hole Oceanographic Institution	New Physiological and Phylogenetic Types of Hyperthermophiles at Deep-Sea Hydrothermal Vents
Eric L.N. Jensen	 Arizona State University	Prospects for Life on Planets in Binary Star Systems
James F. Kasting	 The Pennsylvania State University.	Collaborative Research: Methanogenesis and the Climate of Early Mars
Douglas N. C. Lin	 University of California	Habitable Planets and Satellites in the Outer Solar System
Derek R. Lovley	 University of Massachusetts	Fe (III)-and Humics-Reducing Microorganisms in Extreme Environments
George W. Luther	 University of Delaware	Collaborative Research: Pyrite, a Crucial Mineral and Surface for Microbial Life in Extreme Hydro thermal Environments
Tullis C. Onstott	Princeton University	 A Window Into the Extreme Environment of Deep Subsurface Microbial Communities: Witwatersrand Deep Microbiology Project
Frederick A. Rainey Louisiana State University	Combining Culturing and Non-Culturing Approaches for the Isolation of Prokaryotes from a Hyper Arid Desert Environment
William S. Reeburgh University of California	Experimental Studies on Hydrogen Biogeochemistry in Anoxic Environments
John N. Reeve Ohio State University Longevity and Diversity of Microorganisms Entrapped in Tropical and Polar Ice Cores
David A. Stahl  Northwestern University Diversity and Habitat Range of Sulfate-Reducing Microorganisms
Gordon T. Taylor SUNY at Stony Brook Biology and Ecology of South Pole Snow Microbes
Thomas C. Vogelmann University of Wyoming The Snow Alga Chlamydomonas nivalis: Photosynthesis Under the Greatest Extremes of High Light, UV-B Radiation and Low Temperature on Earth
Russell H. Vreeland West Chester University Paleobiology of Ancient Salt Formations: Examination of Primary Crystals for Biological Materials

See also

 List of ecology awards
 List of environmental awards

References

National Science Foundation
Ecology awards
Environmental sciences awards